Caudotestis ventichthysi is a species of trematodes inhabiting hydrothermal vent fishes (particularly Ventichthys biospeedoi) in the south eastern Pacific Ocean. It can be distinguished from its family by its symmetrical testicular configuration; its uterus passing between the testes. Furthermore, what differentiates it from its cogenerates is caecal length; cirrus sac length; its internal seminal vesicle's shape; vitelline extent and arrangement, as well as forebody length and egg-size.

References

External links
WORMS

Plagiorchiida
Trematodes parasiting fish
Animals described in 2014